The Texarkana Twins were a South Central League (1912), East Texas League (1924-1926), Lone Star League (1927-1929) and Cotton States League (1941) baseball team based in Texarkana, Texas, United States. They were affiliated with the Detroit Tigers in 1941.

In 1912, they finished first in the South Central League, becoming the league's de facto champion, as it folded before the scheduled season ended.

References

Defunct minor league baseball teams
Defunct baseball teams in Texas
Professional baseball teams in Texas
Texarkana, Texas
Baseball teams established in 1912
1912 establishments in Texas
Detroit Tigers minor league affiliates
Baseball teams disestablished in 1941
Defunct Cotton States League teams
East Texas League teams